Amrit is a village in Abou Hammaad, Sharqia Governorate in Egypt.

References

Populated places in Sharqia Governorate
Villages in Egypt